Dicey is a surname. Notable people with the surname include:

A. V. Dicey (1835–1922), British jurist and constitutional theorist
Bill Dicey (1936–1993), American blues harmonicist and singer
Cluer Dicey  (1715–1775), English newspaper proprietor and publisher
Edward Dicey (1832–1911),  British author, editor and journalist
William Dicey (1690–1756), British  printer, publisher, and medicine seller